"She's a Star" is a song written and performed by British alternative rock band James. It was released on 10 February 1997 as the first single from their seventh studio album, Whiplash (1997). "She's a Star" reached number nine on the UK Singles Chart and became a brief hit in Australia and Canada. The song was certified silver by the British Phonographic Industry (BPI) in December 2020 for sales and streams exceeding 200,000 units.

Chart performance
Reaching number nine on the UK Singles Chart, "She's a Star" became the group's third top-10 single and their first since 1991.

Music video
The video for the single features British actress Keeley Hawes.

Track listings

UK CD1
 "She's a Star" – 3:39
 "Stutter" (live) – 6:52
 "Johnny Yen" (live) – 6:46

UK CD2
 "She's a Star" – 3:39
 "Chunney Chops" – 4:58
 "Fishknives" – 3:51
 "Van Gogh's Dog" – 4:06

UK CD3
 "She's a Star" 3:39
 "Come Home" (Weatherall remix) – 8:26
 "She's a Star" (Dave Angel's 'Pat' remix) – 5:30
 "She's a Star" (Andrea's Biosphere mix) – 7:06

UK 7-inch jukebox single
A. "She's a Star"
B. "Chunney Chops"

Charts

Weekly charts

Year-end charts

Certifications

Release history

References

1997 singles
1997 songs
Fontana Records singles
James (band) songs
Song recordings produced by Stephen Hague